Harvey was an electoral district of the Legislative Assembly in the Australian state of Western Australia from 1950 to 1962.

The district was based on the town of Harvey lying to the south of Perth. The seat's only member was Liberal-Country League MP Iven Manning, who went on to become the member for Wellington after its abolition.

Members

Election results

Harvey